The mixed doubles of the tournament 2019 BWF World Junior Championships will be held from 7 to 13 October 2019. The defending champions were Leo Rolly Carnando/Indah Cahya Sari Jamil from Indonesia, but lost to Feng Yanzhe and Lin Fangling from China in the final.

Seeds 

  Leo Rolly Carnando / Indah Cahya Sari Jamil (final)
  Feng Yanzhe / Lin Fangling (champions)
  Ratchapol Makkasasithorn / Benyapa Aimsaard (semifinals)
  Jiang Zhenbang / Li Yijing (semifinals)
  Sirawit Sothon / Pornnicha Suwatnodom (third round)
  Yap Roy King / Gan Jing Err (quarterfinals)
  Ethan van Leeuwen / Annie Lado (second round)
  Rory Easton / Hope Warner (fourth round)

  William Jones / Asmita Chaudhari (third round)
  Egor Kholkin / Mariia Sukhova (third round)
  Andre Timotius Tololiu / Dinda Dwi Cahyaning (second round)
  Tsubasa Kawamura / Kaho Osawa (third round)
  Aaron Sonnenschein / Leona Michalski (fourth round)
  Lev Barinov / Anastasiia Boairun (fourth round)
  Kenji Lovang / Juliette Moinard (fourth round)
  Rasmus Espersen / Christine Busch (fourth round)

Draw

Finals

Top half

Section 1

Section 2

Section 3

Section 4

Bottom half

Section 5

Section 6

Section 7

Section 8

References

2019 BWF World Junior Championships